Matej Čurko (1968 – May 12, 2011), known as The Slovak Cannibal, was a Slovak murderer, cannibal and suspected serial killer. He was killed by police after attempting to entice a Swiss man to his death. Upon investigation, it was discovered that he had killed and eaten two women who had volunteered themselves to be murdered and cannibalized. Soon afterwards, police from Italy announced that the killer could be responsible for up to 28 other disappearances since 2009.

Early life
Matej Čurko was born as one of two sons to a fairly average family, but his parents divorced at a young age. Čurko and his brother, who were not close, were looked after by their mother and grandmother; although they kept in regular contact with their father. Despite being born with the help of a C-Section, Čurko had no recorded illness or injuries at preschool age, passed kindergarten without complications. He even attended a school for mathematically gifted pupils since he was skilled in technical areas.

He was not popular at school, but neither was he bullied or humiliated. Čurko's hobbies were mostly solitary ones, including cycling, playing guitar or drums, using computers and programming them. He was described as a rebel and provocateur by his teachers, as he had trouble keeping respect for the authorities. At age 13, he attacked his 11-year-old neighbor with a knife, causing the boy serious injuries. This stint got the young Čurko transferred to a psychiatric clinic in Košice, where he spent more than a month. After that, he was treated at the Children's Psychiatric Hospital in Hraničné, where intellectual tests showed that he had an above-average IQ of 116.

Adulthood
After completing elementary school, Čurko successfully completed a vocational school with a GCSE before being drafted into the army as a technical specialist, which he also finished without any issues. After returning from the army, Čurko sought employment in the technical industry, and also gained interest in two new hobbies: firearms and martial arts. Eventually, he gained employment as the head of the IT department of an unnamed insurance company. Most peculiarly, he devoted a lot of his time to filing criminal complaints to the Public Prosecutor's Office, which concerned matters ranging from parking issues to high-grade politics.

What struck people as odd concerning Čurko was that he never showed interest in the opposite sex, only finding a partner at age 30, with whom he had two children. Psychiatrists and psychologists later proposed that he showed numerous signs of psychopathy (dislike towards social contact, preference for solitude, emotional coldness, weak empathy, inability to express his feelings and conflict with authority), and likely suffered from necrophilic sadism and a schizoid personality disorder.

Modus Operandi and proven murders
At the time of the murders, Čurko lived in Sokoľ, and regularly traveled to the Kysak forest, where he would meet and subsequently kill the victims. He met them mainly through suicide forums, using the handle "Orion218". The victims, most of whom had suicidal tendencies and openly professed their desire to end their lives, voluntarily agreed to be killed by the cannibal. The procedure involved the pair meeting in the forest, where Čurko would drug the victim before stabbing them in the heart. Afterwards, he would cut up the body using a meat cleaver or one of his many knives, and mask the odor of rotten flesh using pepper. Then, at his pleasure, he would eat whatever part of the body he desired, storing the rest in his refrigerator in Kysak and burying the bodies in shallow graves on his property.

During the search of his property, only two bodies were discovered: those of 30-year-old Elena Gudjakova, from Oravské Veselé, who went missing on June 23, 2010; and the other of 20-year-old Lucia Uchnárová, from Snina, who went missing on September 3, 2010. Both women had issues with mental health, with Lucia previously attempting suicide in 2008, and both had contacted Čurko through the Internet. Their bodies were later found in shallow graves on Čurko's property.

Discovery and death
In the spring of 2011, a young Swiss man by the name of Markus Dubach, who had contemplated suicide due to bullying at work place, posted an ad on the cannibal site where he asked for somebody to kill and eat him. Originally intended as a joke, he was surprisingly contacted by Čurko, who made an offer to do the job. Overtaken by curiosity, Dubach kept in contact with his anonymous would-be killer, even sending him pictures of his legs and buttocks to show his athletic build. Much to Markus' shock, Čurko actually sent him pictures showcasing female body parts, as well as human meat being cooked in a pan. After this, he decided to contact the Swiss authorities, who did not believe him at first, but quickly changed their mind after seeing the messages between the two.

The case was transferred over to their Slovak colleagues, and a special agent was quickly assigned to take Dubach's place in their meeting. Special armed forces were stationed around the meeting area, including a professional sniper, as information obtained by police suggested that the man was armed and very dangerous. Not long after, a man approached the agent. As he had a very casual appearance, he was mistaken for a tourist at first, but the man revealed himself to be the actual cannibal. At that moment, Čurko was ordered to stand down, but instead grabbed a gun from his belt and opened fire upon the agent, hitting him in the chest area. Čurko himself was also hit, his wound proving fatal after falling into a coma.

The full story is told in the book "Die Entscheidung - Begegnung mit einem Kannibalen", which the author Markus Dubach has published on 26 November 2017 (currently only german edition available).

Investigation
While examining his backpack, the police discovered a wide variety of intriguing items which could be used to kill a person: three bottles of vodka, a folding knife, packs of black pepper (presumably to mask the smell), plastic bags, linen, latex gloves, plastic handcuffs, a large knife and a handsaw. Not long after, Čurko's house was searched, where they found several legally-owned weapons, a large number of cartridges, several mobile phones and his computer. An examination of the computer revealed GPS location of two bodies, and an arranged meeting with a 22-year-old man from the Czech Republic. The body locations were later found, with the corpses lacking their heads, legs, breasts and parts of their muscles. They were later identified as Gudjakova and Uchnárová.

A ceremonial altar was also found in the woods, where it is supposed that Čurko cooked and ate body parts. It is unclear if it had any ritualistic purpose, and it was later destroyed by authorities in order to avoid it becoming a sacred site for "sickos".

Other victims
Investigators from Italy managed to connect the profiles of 28 women with Čurko's victim type: age 25–28, suicidal and willingness to be killed and cannibalized. All of them disappeared between January 2009 and May 2011, while he was still active. This is supported by the emails shared between Dubach and Čurko, where a possible victim of Italian nationality was mentioned, and the fact that there were body parts found in his refrigerator which did not match those of Gudjakova or Uchnárová. Authorities followed up leads on the Internet, but due to a law in Slovakia, any information stored prior to 2009 is no longer available.

See also
List of serial killers by country
 Armin Meiwes

References

1968 births
2009 murders in Europe
2011 deaths
2011 murders in Europe
21st-century criminals
2000s murders in Slovakia
2010s murders in Slovakia
Cannibals
Deaths by firearm in Slovakia
People with antisocial personality disorder
People with schizoid personality disorder
Suspected serial killers
Violence against women in Slovakia